Aditya Birla World Academy (ABWA) is a private co-educational LKG-12 day school in Mumbai in the Indian state of Maharashtra built by The Aditya Birla Group in 2008~2009. It was named after the late founder of the conglomerate, Aditya Vikram Birla. Neerja Birla, wife of Kumar Mangalam Birla, is the school's chairperson.

The school prepares students for the IGCSE, A-Levels, and the IB Diploma examinations. The school has been ranked among India's top international schools.

The current principal is Radhika Sinha and the head of the secondary school is Franak Bandekar. The head of IBDP programme is Shalini John. The enrollment currently is about 800 with a staff of about 120.

The school motto is "Learn, Achieve, Inspire".

References

External links
Aditya Birla World Academy Selected as one of the School in top 50 international Schools of india 2016

High schools and secondary schools in Mumbai
International Baccalaureate schools in India